Kędziora, Kędzior, Kendziora, Kendzior, or Kandziora is a surname. It comes from the Polish word kędzior, meaning "lock of hair".

It may refer to:

 Marcel Kandziora (born 1990), German footballer
  (1897–1986), Polish colonel
  (1851–1938), Polish politician
  (1880–1955), Polish politician
 Stanisław Kędziora (1934–2017), auxiliary bishop in Warsaw
 Tomasz Kędziora (born 1994), Polish footballer
 Wojciech Kędziora (born 1980), Polish footballer
 Valdemar Kendzior (1926–1998), Danish footballer
 Kerri Buchberger-Kendziora (born 1970), Canadian volleyball player

References

See also
 
 

Polish-language surnames